Jigsaw may refer to:
 Jigsaw (tool), a tool used for cutting arbitrary curves
 Jigsaw puzzle, a tiling puzzle that requires the assembly of interlocking pieces

Arts and media

Comics 
 Jigsaw (Marvel Comics), a supervillain and arch-enemy of the Punisher
 Jigsaw (Harvey Comics), a Joe Simon-created character and the star of two eponymous series

Film and television 
 Inside Out, a computer-animated Pixar film known as "Jigsaw" in Russian
 Jigsaw (1949 film), a film noir
 Jigsaw (1962 film), a British crime drama directed by Val Guest
 Jigsaw (1968 film), a film directed by James Goldstone
 Jigsaw (1979 film), a Canadian-French drama film
 Jigsaw (1989 film), a thriller film starring Rebecca Gibney
 Jigsaw (American TV series), a 1970s television show
 Jigsaw (British TV series), a BBC children's TV programme
 Jigsaw (Australian game show), a 1965 Seven Network series
 Jigsaw (Saw character), a serial killer in the Saw horror franchise
 Jigsaw (2017 film), the eighth film in the Saw  franchise

Music 
 Jigsaw (Australian band), an Australian pop music group
 Jigsaw (British band), a British pop music group
 Jigsaw (Lady Sovereign album), 2009
 "Jigsaw", a song from Marillion's 1984 album Fugazi
 "Jigsaw Falling into Place", a 2007 song by Radiohead commonly abbreviated to "Jigsaw"
 Jigsaw (Shadows album), 1967
 Jigsaw (Mike Stern album), 1989
 "Jigsaw", a song by Renaissance from the 1981 album Camera Camera
 "Jigsaw", a 2022 song by Conan Gray

Other media
 Jigsaw (video game), a 1995 text adventure by Graham Nelson
 Jigsaw (website), a website for trading business contacts
 Jigsaw (wrestler) (born 1983), American professional wrestler
 Jigsaw (novel), a 1989 semi-autobiographical novel by Sybille Bedford

Computing 
 Jigsaw project, of Java Platform Module System
 Jigsaw Download, or short Jigdo, a tool designed to ease the distribution of very large files over the internet (e.g. CD/DVD images)
 Jigsaw (ransomware), an encrypting ransomware

Other uses 
 Jigsaw (company), formerly Google Ideas, a technology incubator created by Google
 Jigsaw (teaching technique), a teaching technique invented by social psychologist Elliot Aronson in 1971
 Jigsaw (clothing retailer), a women's clothing retailer
 Jigsaw Islands, two small islands lying off Antarctica's Palmer Archipelago
 Jigsaw, common name of the moth Dysgonia torrida

See also
 Jig (disambiguation)
 Saw (disambiguation)